Amphicallia solai is a moth of the subfamily Arctiinae first described by Herbert Druce in 1907. It is found in Ethiopia, Kenya and Tanzania.

The larvae feed on Schinus molle and Crotalaria species.

References

Moths described in 1907
Arctiini
Moths of Africa
Insects of Ethiopia
Insects of Tanzania